A garland is a class of decoration, of which there are many types.

Garland may also refer to:

Places
In the United States
Garland, Arkansas, a town in Miller County
Garland County, Arkansas
Garland, Kansas, a town in Bourbon County
Garland, Maine, a town in Penobscot County
Garland, Missouri, an unincorporated community
Garland, Nebraska, a village in Seward County
Garland, North Carolina, a town in Sampson County
Garland, Ohio, an unincorporated community
Garland, Texas, a suburb of Dallas
Garland Independent School District
Garland, Utah, a city in Box Elder County
Garland, Wyoming, a village in Park County

People
Garland (surname), a surname
Garland Grange (1906–1981), American football player
Garland Gregory (1919–2011), American football player
Garland Jean-Batiste (born 1965), American football player
Garland Kirkpatrick (born 1960), American designer, educator, and curator
Judy Garland (1922-1969), American actress and singer
Merrick Garland (born 1952), 86th United States attorney general 
Red Garland (1923-1984), American jazz pianist

Fiction
Garland, the first boss and the main antagonist of Final Fantasy I
Garland, an antagonist in Final Fantasy IX
Garland, a character in 8-Bit Theater
Garland Siebald, a character from Beyblade
Garland SF-01, SF-02 and SF-03, race cars in Future GPX Cyber Formula

Other uses
Garlands (album), an album by the Cocteau Twins
Garland Publishing, a scholarly publisher, now part of Taylor & Francis Group
Garland Encyclopedia of World Music 10 vols. 1989-1994
HMS Garland, the name of fifteen vessels in the Royal Navy